The Delaware River Port Authority (DRPA), officially the Delaware River Port Authority of Pennsylvania and New Jersey, is a bi-state agency instrumentality created by a congressionally approved interstate compact between the governments of Pennsylvania and New Jersey. The authority is principally charged to maintain and develop transportation links between the two states with four bridges and a mass transit rail line across the Delaware River. Though the DRPA has "port" in its name, it does not own or operate any ports.

History 
In 1919, the Pennsylvania and New Jersey legislatures approved the creation of the Delaware River Bridge Joint Commission. The first meeting was held on December 12, 1919, with commissioners from both Pennsylvania and New Jersey. On July 1, 1926, the first bridge opened before a crowd of over 25,000 people. It was named the "Delaware River Bridge", and following the ceremony, over 100,000 people participated in the inaugural walk. United States President Calvin Coolidge came the next day to dedicate the bridge. However, there was thought that there should be a regional governing body for a port authority, and also the construction of another bridge and a high-speed rail line. And so, on July 17, 1951, United States President Harry S. Truman signed a bill that created the Delaware River Port Authority. In 1953, construction started on a new bridge to connect South Philadelphia and Gloucester City. In 1955, the existing bridge was renamed Benjamin Franklin Bridge, while the name Walt Whitman Bridge was approved for the new bridge that would open in 1957. By 1966, two more bridges were approved: the Commodore Barry Bridge (opened February 1, 1974) and the Betsy Ross Bridge (opened April 30, 1976). In 1974 and 1990, the Ben Franklin Bridge and the Walt Whitman Bridge carried their one-billionth vehicle, respectively.

In 2011, DRPA ceased operating the Philadelphia Cruise Terminal. In 2015, DRPA sold the RiverLink Ferry to the Delaware River Waterfront Corporation and the Cooper's Ferry Partnership.

In 2022, the DRPA completed the installation of more than 20 MW of solar panels at its facilities, built by TotalEnergies. The Lindenwold, Ashland, Woodcrest, and Ferry Avenue PATCO stations, as well as the Betsy Ross Bridge, Commodore Barry Bridge, and DRPA's headquarters in Camden, have large solar canopies covering their parking lots. These will provide more than half of the DRPA's electricity usage and will save it $12 million over a 20-year PPA contract.

Board of Commissioners 
The Delaware River Port Authority is governed by 16 commissioners; eight commissioners each represent New Jersey and Pennsylvania. All eight New Jersey commissioners are appointed by the governor of New Jersey, and six Pennsylvania commissioners are appointed by the governor of Pennsylvania. The Pennsylvania treasurer and the Pennsylvania auditor general serve as ex officio commissioners. These two officers are elected officials.

The 16 commissioners also serve as the board of directors for the Port Authority Transit Corporation or PATCO, a DRPA subsidiary.

Facilities

Bridges 

The DRPA operates and maintains four bridges that cross the Delaware River between Pennsylvania and New Jersey. All four bridges charge a $5 westbound toll. From southwest to northeast, they are:
Commodore Barry Bridge – Completed in 1974, and the longest out of the four bridges. It connects Chester, Pennsylvania with Bridgeport, New Jersey. It carries U.S. Route 322 and New Jersey County Route 536. It is the last crossing of the Delaware River between New Jersey and Pennsylvania; the next crossing, to the south, is the Delaware Memorial Bridge between New Jersey and Delaware.
Walt Whitman Bridge – The most heavily traveled of the four bridges, the Walt Whitman Bridge connects South Philadelphia to Gloucester City, New Jersey. It carries Interstate 76, also known as the Schuylkill Expressway. For passengers going to Pennsylvania from New Jersey, it sees its heaviest volume traffic during sports contests, as the South Philadelphia Sports Complex is at the foot of the bridge. For passengers going into New Jersey from Pennsylvania, it sees its heaviest volume traffic from Memorial Day Weekend through Labor Day, as the Walt Whitman provides access via I-76 and New Jersey Route 42 to the Atlantic City Expressway, and thus to shore points in South Jersey, where many Philadelphia-area residents have shore houses, or go for a day trip.
Benjamin Franklin Bridge – The first completed bridge out of the four (opened in 1926), carries U.S. Route 30 and Interstate 676, as well as the PATCO Speedline. The bridge connects Camden, New Jersey with Center City, Philadelphia. It held the position of the World's longest suspension bridge from 1926 to 1929, until being surpassed by the Ambassador Bridge.
Betsy Ross Bridge – The youngest of the four bridges (opened 1976), it connects the Bridesburg section of Philadelphia to Pennsauken. It carries New Jersey Route 90. Upon arriving in Pennsylvania, it has a direct intersection with I-95.

Public transportation 
PATCO Speedline (rapid transit line)

Real estate 
One Port Center, Camden, New Jersey

Former 
AmeriPort Intermodal (Closed rail yard)
RiverLink Ferry (now operated by Delaware River Waterfront Corporation)
Skylink (aerial tramway, partially built and then abandoned)

Police Department 

The DRPA Police Department  provides police services on all DRPA properties.

See also 
Interstate compact
List of crossings of the Delaware River
Delaware River Joint Toll Bridge Commission (another bi-state agency of New Jersey and Pennsylvania that operates bridges further north on the Delaware River)
Delaware River and Bay Authority (a bi-state agency of Delaware and New Jersey that operates bridges further south on the Delaware River)
Port Authority of New York and New Jersey (a bi-state agency of New York and New Jersey that also operates a rapid transit line, PATH)

References

External links 

Delaware River Port Authority Police Department page

 
Delaware River
United States interstate agencies
New Jersey law
Pennsylvania law
Port authorities in the United States
Ports and harbors of New Jersey
River ports of the United States
1951 establishments in New Jersey
Government agencies established in 1951
Camden, New Jersey
Intermodal transportation authorities in New Jersey
Bridges in New Jersey
Bridges in Pennsylvania
Toll road authorities of the United States